Mulaza Kaira (born 10 October 1984), also known by the stage names Macky II, Macky 2, MK Macky 2, DJ Bugar, and Flava Boy, is a Zambian Multi-Award winning hip hop musician, singer, Songwriter and producer. He is known for participating in the ninth season of Big Brother Africa, where he placed third in the competition. Kaira is from Chingola, Zambia and runs the Macky 2 Hope Foundation, which supports orphans and vulnerable children.

Music career
Kaira began showing an interest in music in his childhood after attending the Catholic church in Ndola.

In 2011 he left home to travel to Lusaka, where he released his album Ndimupondo under the Digital X label with Alpha Entertainment and J-Kayo. Two songs from the album, "I am The President" and "Number 1 Fan", received radio play and were positively received by audiences. Kaira received the Zambia Music Award for Album of the Year in 2013 for his album Legendary. In 2014  He was nominated in the Zambia Music Awards, in the categories of Best Mainstream Artist, Best Hip Hop/Rap Album and Best Collaboration.As of 2022, Macky 2 marked his retirement from active music with an album OLIJABA released on June 5 and the same date marked his official entry into a reality TV show called KING BUGA which premiered on the same date on Zambezi Magic Channel.

Big Brother Africa 9
Kaira was a contestant on the ninth season of Big Brother Africa, and some viewers stated that he was "too quiet". He survived in the house for the full length of the show and received a substantial amount of support from his fans and Zambians at large. He stayed in the house until the ninth and final week, when he was eliminated in third place.

Discography

Albums
Ghetto President (2018)
Legendary(2012) 
Ndimupondo
Too Much Influence (2012)
Zero to Hero (2013)
OLIJABA (2022), (released on 5 June)

Selected songs
 "Feeling Feeling" - 2012
 "Nangu Banchinge" - 2012
 "Mukulu" - 2012
 "Without You" - 2012
 "Too Much Influence" - 2012
 "Ngani Gelo Wandi" - 2012
 "Pamaka" - 2012
 "Why" - 2012
 "Land Lord" - 2012
 "Favor"
 "Mami (niuze)" - 2011
 "Mama Rebecca" - 2015
 "Mrs me" - 2020
 "Sancho (Mwabombeni)" - 2021
"Early Riser" - 2020
"Alabalansa" - 2021
"Google"

Awards
 2011 Radio 4 song of the year Born n Bred Awards - "Mami (niuze)"
 2013 Album of the year Zambian Music Awards - Legendary
 2015 Song of the year Zambia Music Awards - "Mama Rebecca"
 2018 Album of the year Kwacha Music Awards

Personal life
Mulaza Kaira is married to Cheelo Hantiinga with whom they have a Daughter and a Son.

External Links 

 Twitter

References

1984 births
Living people
21st-century Zambian male singers
People from Luanshya